The Cantabrian Mountains or Cantabrian Range are one of the main systems of mountain ranges in Spain. 
They stretch for over 300 km (180 miles) across northern Spain, from the western limit of the Pyrenees to the Galician Massif in Galicia, along the coast of the Cantabrian Sea. Their easternmost end meets the Sistema Ibérico.

These mountains are a distinct physiographic province of the larger Alpine System physiographic division.

The Cantabrian Mountains offer a wide range of trails for hiking, as well as many challenging climbing routes. Skiing is possible in the ski resorts of Alto Campoo, Valgrande-Pajares, Fuentes de Invierno, San Isidro, Leitariegos and Manzaneda.

Geography
The Cantabrian Mountains stretch east-west, nearly parallel to the Cantabrian Sea, as far as the pass of Leitariegos, also extending south between León and Galicia. The range's western boundary is marked by the valley of the river Minho, by the lower Sil, which flows into the Miño, and by the Cabrera River, a small tributary of the Sil. The Cantabrian Mountains reach their south-western limit in Portugal.

As a whole, the Cantabrian Mountains are remarkable for their intricate ramifications, but almost everywhere, and especially in the east, it is possible to distinguish two principal ranges, from which the lesser ridges and mountain masses radiate. One range, or series of ranges, closely follows the outline of the coast; the other, which is loftier, forms the northern limit of the great tableland of Castile and León, and is sometimes regarded as a continuation of the Pyrenees.  In some parts the coastal range rises sheer above the sea, and everywhere has so abrupt a declivity that the streams which flow seaward are all short and swift.

The descent from the southern range to the high plateaux of Castile is more gradual, and several large rivers, notably the Ebro, rise here and flow to the south or west. A conspicuous feature of the chain, as of the adjacent tableland, is the number of its parameras, isolated plateaus shut in by lofty mountains or even by precipitous walls of rock.

The Cantabrian Mountains make a sharp divide between "Green Spain" to the north, and the dry central plateau. The north facing slopes receive heavy cyclonic rainfall from the Cantabrian Sea, whereas the southern slopes are in rain shadow.

Main ranges
The Cantabrian Range has three very distinct sections from west to east:

Western

The Asturian Massif and its foothills. Geologically it is an eastern prolongation of the Galician Massif with Paleozoic folds. It is cut by deep east-west oriented canyons such as the Cares River valley. Highest point Torre de Cerredo 2,648 m.
Sierra de la Bobia, Pico de la Bobia 1,201 m
Sierra de Tineo, Mulleiroso 1,241 m, a northern foothill located near Tineo
Sierra de San Isidro, Campo de La Vaga 1,078 m
Sierra de Eirelo, Pena dos Ladróis 800 m
Sierra del Sueve, Picu Pienzu 1,161 m, a northern foothill west of the Sella River
Sierra de Cuera, Pico Turbina 1,315 m, a northern foothill located at the eastern end of Asturias
Sierra de Quintanal, running transversally on the eastern side of the Narcea River
Other ranges of the Asturian Massif are: Sierra del Aramo, Sierra de Pando, Sierra de Caniellas, Sierra de Rañadoiro, Loma de Parrondo, Sierra de San Mamés, Sierra de Serrantina, Sierra de la Zarza, Sierra de Degaña, Sierra del Acebo, Sierra de Sobia, Cordal de Lena, Sierra de Casomera, Porrones de Moneo, and Cordal de Ponga

Central

The main mountains of this zone are the massive Picos de Europa. They are composed of Carboniferous limestone and marl. The  Paramo de Masa and La Lora grasslands are located in the south crossed by the Rudrón Valley. 
Sierra de Covadonga, west of the Picos de Europa
Sierra de Dobros, north of the Picos de Europa
The Picos de Europa are divided into three sectors or massifs:
Cornión Massif in the west, Torre Santa 2,596 m
Urrieles Massif in the center, Torrecerredo 2,650 m
Ándara Massif in the east, Morra de Lechugales 2,444 m
Sierra de Liencres, a coastal range, another northern foothill
Sierra Nedrina
Mountain ranges in Cantabria, located further east:
Fuentes Carrionas Massif, Peña Prieta 2,536 m, close to the eastern end of the Picos de Europa
Sierra Cocón above Tresviso
Sierra del Escudo de Cabuérniga, a northern foothill of the system, located between the main ridges and the sea
Sierra de la Gándara, Peña Cabarga 537 m, a lower northern foothill located further east
Montes de Ucieda
Alto del Gueto
Sierra de la Matanza
Sierra de Peña Sagra, Peña Sagra 2,046 m
Sierra de Peña Labra, Pico Tres Mares 2,175 m and Peña Labra 2,006 m
Sierra del Cordel in the Saja and Nansa Comarca
Sierra del Escudo, between Campoo de Yuso and Luena
Sierra de Híjar, foothills located in the high plateau at the southeastern end of the central zone
Valdecebollas
Sierra del Hornijo, Mortillano 1,410
Sierra de Breñas, foothill running perpendicular to the coast
Montes de Pas, Castro Valnera 1,707 m in the transition area to the Basque Mountains

Eastern

The Basque Mountains at the eastern end of the system, with very eroded Mesozoic folds and ranges of moderate height: 
Inner ranges:
Sierra Salbada (Orduña)
Mounts of Gasteiz, Kapildui 1,177 m
Izki
Urbasa, Baiza 1,183 m
Andía, with the impressive Beriain 1,493 m
Coastal ranges:
Gorbea (Gorbeia) 1,481 m
Urkiola, Anboto 1,331 m 
Elgea
Aizkorri, Aitxuri 1,551 m, highest peak in the Basque Mountains
Altzania, Aratz 1,442 m
Aralar, Txindoki 1,346 m
Other important mountains close to the sea include Ganekogorta, Oiz, Sollube, Arrate, Kalamua and Hernio

Flora and fauna

The Cantabrian Mountains are home to an important variety of plant life, as well as the Cantabrian brown bear (Ursus arctos pyrenaicus), catalogued as being in danger of extinction, which extends from Asturias (the region where its population is bigger) to areas in Léon, Palencia and Cantabria, and the Cantabrian capercaillie (T. urogallus cantabricus).

Other animals associated with the range include the Iberian wolf (Canis lupus signatus) and the rebeco, or Cantabrian chamois (Rupicapra pyrenaica parva).

Woodland in the Cantabrian Mountains is generally predominated by beeches (Fagus sylvatica).

The Pyrenean ibex (Capra pyrenaica pyrenaica), one of the four subspecies of the Iberian ibex (Capra pyrenaica), which used to inhabit the Cantabrian Mountains, became extinct in 2000.

Protected areas 
The Cantabrian mountain range includes several protected areas such as the Picos de Europa National Park, which is one of several Cantabrian parks included in UNESCO's World Network of Biosphere Reserves. Some of the sites are included in the European Union's Natura 2000 network and Special Protection Areas for the Conservation of Wild Birds.
Picos de Europa National Park
Muniellos Nature Reserve
Fuentes del Narcea, Degaña e Ibias Natural Park
Redes Natural Park
Somiedo Natural Park
Protected Landscape Area of Sierra del Sueve
Fuentes Carrionas and Fuente Cobre-Montaña Palentina Natural Park
Saja-Besaya Natural Park
Collados del Asón Natural Park
Ojo Guareña

References

Sources

External links 

iberianature.com - English-language web site on nature in Spain and Portugal
Cantabrian Institute of Biodiversity
 Parque Natural de Las Ubiñas-La Mesa - Reserva de la Biosfera (I)

 
Mountain ranges of the Basque Country (autonomous community)
Mountain ranges of Castile and León
Mountain ranges of Cantabria
Mountain ranges of Asturias
Mountain ranges of Europe